Veber or Véber is a surname. Notable people with the surname include:

 Francis Veber (born 1937), French film director, screenwriter, producer and playwright
 György Véber (born 1969), Hungarian footballer
 Jiří Veber, Czech ice hockey player
 Pierre Veber (1869–1942), French playwright and writer
 Raymonde Jones Veber, French tennis player
 Roman Veber (born 1969), Slovak ice hockey player